Romeo Travis (born December 10, 1984) is an American-born naturalized Macedonian professional basketball player who last played for Limoges CSP of the LNB Pro A. He played college basketball for the University of Akron.

High school career
Travis was born in Akron, Ohio. As a high school standout at Akron's St. Vincent–St. Mary High School, Travis played alongside LeBron James. Travis averaged 17 points and 11 rebounds during his prep career, spanning his sophomore, junior, and senior years. The Irish were OHSAA Division III state champions in his sophomore year, and in his senior year they won the Division II state championship.

College career
After graduation, he stayed in his hometown and went on to become the University of Akron's all-time blocked shots leader (161); he also finished ranked seventh on the career scoring chart (1,491) and ninth in career rebounds (783). In 2006–07, as a senior, he was named an Associated Press All-American and was honored as the Mid-American Conference Player of the Year.

Professional career
On June 30, 2009, Travis signed with German club Walter Tigers Tübingen for the 2009–10 season.

While playing for Hapoel Gilboa Galil Travis was named All-Israeli League Player of the Year, All-Israeli League Forward of the Year, All-Israeli League 1st Team, Israeli League All-Imports Team, All-Balkan League Forward of the Year, All-Balkan League First Team and All-Balkans League All-Imports Team by Eurobasket.com for the 2012 season. Travis was also a member of Israeli Premier League Regular Season Runner-Up and Israeli Premier League All-Star Game for the 2012 season.

In August 2012 Travis signed with KK Zadar of Croatia for the 2012–13 season. While playing for Zadar during the 2012–13 Adriatic league season he was named MVP of the week four times.

In July 2013, Travis signed with Khimik of the Ukrainian Basketball SuperLeague for the 2013–14 season.

On July 25, 2014, he signed with BC Krasny Oktyabr of Russia for the 2014–15 season. On April 13, 2015, he left the Russian club and signed with Alaska Aces of the Philippine Basketball Association. On July 13, 2015, he was awarded as the Bobby Parks PBA Best Import of the Conference, topping three other candidate imports.

On October 13, 2015, he signed a short-term deal with Strasbourg IG of the French Pro A and EuroLeague. On November 29, 2015, he left Strasbourg after appearing in six league games and six Euroleague games. On December 28, 2015, he signed with Le Mans Sarthe Basket for the rest of the season.

On August 18, 2016, Travis signed with Italian club Pallacanestro Cantù for the 2016–17 season. On November 8, 2016, he parted ways with Cantù after appearing in six games. On the same day he signed with his former club SIG Strasbourg for the rest of the season.

On July 7, 2017, Travis signed with his former team Le Mans Sarthe Basket for the 2017–18 season.

On 2018, Travis signed with Magnolia Hotshots for the 2018 and 2019 PBA Governors' Cup. On November 6, 2018, he recorded a triple-double of 18 points, 20 rebounds and 12 assists in a 103-99 win over the Blackwater Elite. He scored a career-high 50 points for the Hotshots as they defeat the Barangay Ginebra San Miguel in Game 4 of the 2018 Governors' Cup.

On December 28, 2020, he has signed with Limoges CSP of the LNB Pro A. In his first game with Limoges, he contributed 6 points and 6 rebounds in 20 minutes off the bench. However, they were defeated 68-91 by Le Mans.

The Basketball Tournament
In 2017, Travis participated in The Basketball Tournament for Ram Nation. The team made it to the Elite 8 before being eliminated by eventual tournament champions Overseas Elite. The Basketball Tournament is an annual $2 million winner-take-all tournament broadcast on ESPN.

National team
Travis was naturalized by the Macedonian Basketball Federation on July 28, 2016 in order to play for the Macedonian national basketball team in the EuroBasket 2017 qualification.

References

External links
 Eurobasket.com profile
 FIBA.com profile

1984 births
Living people
ABA League players
Akron Zips men's basketball players
Alaska Aces (PBA) players
American expatriate basketball people in Croatia
American expatriate basketball people in France
American expatriate basketball people in Germany
American expatriate basketball people in Israel
American expatriate basketball people in Italy
American expatriate basketball people in the Philippines
American expatriate basketball people in Russia
American expatriate basketball people in Spain
American expatriate basketball people in Thailand
American expatriate basketball people in Ukraine
American men's basketball players
ASEAN Basketball League players
Barak Netanya B.C. players
Basketball players from Akron, Ohio
BC Khimik players
BC Krasny Oktyabr players
Cantabria Baloncesto players
Hapoel Gilboa Galil Elyon players
KK Zadar players
Lega Basket Serie A players
Le Mans Sarthe Basket players
Macedonian expatriate basketball people in France
Macedonian men's basketball players
Magnolia Hotshots players
Pallacanestro Cantù players
Philippine Basketball Association imports
Ratiopharm Ulm players
Shooting guards
SIG Basket players
Small forwards
St. Vincent–St. Mary High School alumni
Tigers Tübingen players